Narasimharaju or Narasimha Raju is the name of two Indian actors:

 Narasimharaju (Kannada actor) (1923–1979), Indian comedian
 Narasimharaju (Telugu actor) (born 1951)